Myeloid leukemia factor 1 is a protein that in humans is encoded by the MLF1 gene.

References

Further reading